Eric Wayne McClure (December 11, 1978 – May 2, 2021) was an American professional stock car racing driver and team owner. He last competed part-time in the NASCAR Xfinity Series, driving the No. 0 Chevrolet Camaro for JD Motorsports.

Racing career

Sprint Cup Series
McClure made three career starts in NASCAR's Cup Series. His debut came at Talladega, driving the No. 04 I Can Learn Chevy in 2004.  He made the field in 35th position, and went on to finish 26th. McClure then attempted to make the July race at Daytona, but did not qualify.

McClure then landed a ride with the No. 73 Raabe Racing Enterprises Chevy for 2005.  McClure did not qualify for the first two races, but did make the race at Las Vegas, starting 41st.  His engine blew midway through the race and relegated McClure to 32nd.  McClure left the team that week and did not run until August, when he attempted three races with Front Row Motorsports. However, McClure did not make any of those races. In 2006 he attempted and made the UAW-Ford 500, where handling issues relegated him to a 32nd-place finish in the No. 04 Morgan-McClure Motorsports Chevy, with a sponsorship from Hefty. In 2008, McClure attempted the Daytona 500 in the No. 37 Front Row Motorsports Chevy sponsored by Hefty, but failed to qualify.

On April 11, 2009, Morgan-McClure Motorsports announced they would be attempting the Talladega race in April, after a year and a half absence from the sport. Eric McClure attempted to qualify the Hefty-sponsored No. 4 Chevrolet but did not make the field.

In January 2014, McClure announced that he would attempt to compete in the 2014 Daytona 500 driving the No. 35 Ford for Front Row Motorsports; he failed to qualify for the race. In May 2014, McClure returned to the No. 35 car for Front Row Motorsports at Talladega, but failed to make the race.

Xfinity Series
McClure made his Busch Series debut in 2003, running at Rockingham Speedway.  He qualified the No. 05 I Can Learn Chevy in 22nd and finished 26th despite an accident.

McClure made four starts in 2004, running two races for his family team (MMM) and two more for Mac Hill Motorsports.  His best run was at Memphis, where he finished 22nd.  He also finished three of his four starts.

McClure added eight starts in 2005, seven for Means Racing, but only managed a best finish of 30th at Texas. McClure did attract the eye of James Finch and ran one race for that team at Daytona. However, he finished 32nd with a blown engine and did not follow that run up with any starts, returning to Means.  McClure did not qualify for two races. At Bristol, McClure was sent home because of a rainout of qualifying, and at Memphis, McClure missed the field by one spot.

For the 2007 season, McClure teamed up with Davis Motorsports for a 32 race schedule. McClure brought sponsor Hefty to the team with him.

He drove for Front Row Motorsports in the Busch Series in 2008, with Hefty sponsoring the car for all the races in the No. 24 Chevrolet. He scored his best career finish of 15th in the Aaron's 312 at Talladega.

In 2009, he and sponsor Hefty moved to Rensi/Hamilton Racing, where he drove the No. 24 Ford Fusion. This proved to be a good move; he qualified for every race and finished a career best 17th in the final points standings. McClure stuck with the team, now Team Rensi Motorsports, for 2010. However, performance slipped and the economic downturn forced McClure to be cautious with the team's equipment, with Rensi bringing a second team over for COT races that was raced by Kelly Bires. Despite this, McClure finished 24th in points but announced his departure from Rensi on November 30. According to McClure, Rensi's budget was so low to the point that they would rarely have full tire allotments for the races after Las Vegas, with most of the allotments going to the races run with Bires. McClure announced on December 1 that he and Hefty would move to TriStar Motorsports for 2011 alongside veterans Mike Bliss and Jeff Green. It was further announced in January that TriStar Motorsports will change their car numbers, with McClure piloting the No. 14.

During the 2012 Aaron's 312, McClure was involved in a 16-car pile up on lap 117, when cars spun in front of him and he slammed the inside wall head on. McClure was extracted from his car. He was airlifted to the University of Alabama Hospital in Birmingham, Alabama for further evaluation. NASCAR stated that McClure was talking to the rescue crew while he was being extracted from his car. After staying two nights in the hospital, TriStar Motorsports team spokesperson Emily Brandt announced on May 6, 2012 that McClure had suffered a concussion and internal bruises from the accident. On May 9, TriStar announced that McClure would sit out the Nationwide race at Darlington due to his concussion, and that start and park driver Jeff Green would drive the No. 14 while Tony Raines and Kevin Lepage would start and park the No. 10. McClure would sit out the next 4 races before being cleared by NASCAR to drive in time for the race at Road America. In spite of starting only 28 races, McClure finished the 2012 season with a career best points finish of 16th.

On January 9, 2013, TriStar announced that McClure would return to their team for the 2013 season. McClure started his season on a high note by taking his best career finish of 7th at Daytona. In August, however, he was hospitalized with what was determined to be acute renal failure; he was forced to step out of the No. 14 car for four races while he recovered, being substituted for by Jeff Green. McClure returned to competition in September at Chicagoland Speedway. He missed a race later in the year at Texas Motor Speedway due to medical issues, before being hospitalized again prior to the season finale at Homestead-Miami Speedway.

Before the 2014 season McClure announced that he would only be running a partial schedule in the Nationwide Series.

In 2015, McClure and his sponsors moved to JGL Racing, where he drove the No. 24 Toyota Camry at all 33 races. After 9 races however, both he and JGL parted ways and McClure returned to TriStar Motorsports for the rest of the season, with JGL allowing him to continue to run the 24 car for that team.

In 2016, McClure joined JD Motorsports for the season opener at Daytona, driving the No. 0 Chevrolet Camaro.

Team ownership
On July 28, 2015, McClure and former Nationwide driver Hal Martin formed Martin-McClure Racing, a K&N Pro Series East team. Among the team's drivers were Chad Finchum and Austin Cindric.

McClure stepped away from the team in 2018 after his domestic violence arrest.

Personal life 

McClure was born in Chilhowie, Virginia, and was a graduate of Emory and Henry College. He was married to Miranda from 2004 until their divorce in 2018, and had seven daughters.

McClure's home in Abingdon, Virginia suffered major damage in an April 27, 2011 tornado. However, McClure and his family sat out the storm in their basement and were uninjured.

On February 11, 2018, McClure was arrested for domestic violence.

Death 
McClure died on May 2, 2021, at the age of 42 after suffering from serious health issues, including diagnosis of a severe musculoskeletal disorder in the summer of 2019. He was engaged to Keira Brinegar Tibbs at the time of his death.

Motorsports career results

NASCAR
(key) (Bold – Pole position awarded by qualifying time. Italics – Pole position earned by points standings or practice time. * – Most laps led.)

Sprint Cup Series

Daytona 500

Xfinity Series

Craftsman Truck Series

 Season still in progress.
 Ineligible for series championship points.

References

External links 

 

1978 births
2021 deaths
People from Chilhowie, Virginia
Racing drivers from Virginia
NASCAR drivers
NASCAR team owners
Emory and Henry College alumni
People from Abingdon, Virginia
Deaths from musculoskeletal disorders